Aleksandra and Konstantin (Belarusian: , Aliaksandra i Kanstantsin) is a Belarusian musical duo composed of singer Aleksandra Kirsanova (Aliaksandra Kirsanava) and guitarist Konstantin Drapezo (Kanstantsin Drapeza). 

The duo was formed in 1998. They represented Belarus in their inaugural entry in the Eurovision Song Contest, singing "My Galileo" in the 2004 Contest. which failed to qualify to the final scoring only 10 points tying with Monaco for 19th place from a pool of 22. One of the their backing singers during the performance Petr Elfimov represented Belarus 5 years later for the Eurovision 2009 Contest in Moscow.

Discography

Albums
 За ліхімі за марозамі (Ковчег, 2001)
 Сойка (2003)
 A&K Лепшае (West Records, 2004)
 Аўтаномная Навігацыя (West Records, 2006)
 Ключы златыя (Vigma, 2009)
 М1 (Vigma, 2013)

EPs 
 My Galileo. The Best (2004)
 Масьленіца (2011)

References

Eurovision Song Contest entrants for Belarus
Eurovision Song Contest entrants of 2004
Belarusian pop music groups